MA-5 may refer to:

 Marquart MA-5 Charger, an American biplane aircraft design
 
 Massachusetts Route 5
 Mercury-Atlas 5, a test flight of Project Mercury